Jens David Joacim Moberg Karlsson (born 20 March 1994) is a Swedish professional footballer who plays for Urawa Red Diamonds as a winger or a forward. He has won three caps and scored one goal for the Sweden national team.

Club career

Early career
David Moberg Karlsson grew up just outside Mariestad in Sweden where he made his first team debut for local fifth tier club IFK Mariestad as a fourteen-year-old. Due to his impressive performances with the Swedish youth national teams he was sought after by several clubs, but chose to sign a youth contract with IFK Göteborg, the club he grew up supporting.

IFK Göteborg
During the 2011 Allsvenskan season he started training with the first team and made his league debut in a game against AIK. His progress led to IFK Göteborg signing him on a five-year first team contract in May 2012. At the start of the 2013 Allsvenskan season he finally scored his first league goal for the club in a 2–0 win against IF Brommapojkarna.

Sunderland
On 19 June 2013, he signed for Premier League club Sunderland for an estimated €1.9 million. Moberg Karlsson scored his first goal for Sunderland in the Premier League Asia Trophy against Tottenham Hotspur on 24 July 2013. He made his competitive debut against Milton Keynes Dons in the Football League Cup, starting in a 4–2 victory.

Loan to Kilmarnock
On 31 January 2014, Karlsson joined Kilmarnock on loan for the remainder of the season.

FC Nordsjælland
On 13 August 2014, Karlsson joined Danish club FC Nordsjælland on a four-year contract for an undisclosed fee.

IFK Norrköping
On 21 June 2016, Karlsson joined IFK Norrköping on a -year-long contract for an undisclosed fee.

Sparta Prague
On 10 December 2018, Karlsson joined AC Sparta Prague on a -year-long contract for an undisclosed fee.

Urawa Reds
On 30 December 2021, Karlsson joined Urawa Red Diamonds.

International career 
Having represented the Sweden U17, U19, and U21 teams between 2009 and 2017, he made his full international debut for Sweden on 8 January 2017 in a friendly 1–2 loss against the Ivory Coast when he replaced Nicklas Bärkroth in the 62nd minute. He scored his first international goal in a friendly 6–0 win against Slovakia on 12 January 2017.

Career statistics

Club

International 

Scores and results list Sweden's goal tally first, score column indicates score after each Karlsson goal.

Honours
IFK Göteborg
Svenska Cupen: 2012–13

Sparta Prague
Czech Cup: 2019–20

References

External links
 David Moberg Karlsson on FC Nordsjælland 
 
 

1994 births
Living people
People from Mariestad Municipality
Swedish footballers
Sweden youth international footballers
Sweden under-21 international footballers
Sweden international footballers
Association football forwards
Allsvenskan players
Scottish Professional Football League players
Czech First League players
IFK Göteborg players
IFK Norrköping players
Sunderland A.F.C. players
Kilmarnock F.C. players
FC Nordsjælland players
AC Sparta Prague players
Swedish expatriate footballers
Swedish expatriate sportspeople in England
Expatriate footballers in England
Swedish expatriate sportspeople in Scotland
Expatriate footballers in Scotland
Swedish expatriate sportspeople in Denmark
Expatriate men's footballers in Denmark
Swedish expatriate sportspeople in the Czech Republic
Expatriate footballers in the Czech Republic
Urawa Red Diamonds players
Expatriate footballers in Japan
Swedish expatriate sportspeople in Japan
Sportspeople from Västra Götaland County